Icelinusis a genus of marine ray-finned fishes belonging to the family Cottidae, the typical sculpins. These fishes are found in the northern and eastern Pacific Ocean.

Taxonomy
Icelinus was first proposed as a monospecific genus in 1885 by the American ichthyologist David Starr Jordan with its only and type species being Artedius quadriseriatus. This species had been described in 1880 by the English zoologist William Neale Lockington from San Francisco. The 5th edition of Fishes of the World classifies this genus within the subfamily Cottinae of the family Cottidae, however, other authors classify the genus within the subfamily Oligocottinae of the family Psychrolutidae. The genus Icelinus may not be monophyletic as a study found that the 9 eastern Pacific species were in a clade which was a sister taxon to the genera Furcina and Antipodocottus while the 2 northwestern Pacific species (I. japonicus and I. pietschi) were found to be so closely related to the genus Stlengis that they were placed within that genus, leaving Icelinus confined to the eastern Pacific.

Etymology
Icelinus is a diminutive of Icelus, the genus I. quadriseriatus was thought to belong to.

Species
There are currently 11 recognized species in this genus:
 Icelinus borealis C. H. Gilbert, 1896 (Northern sculpin)
 Icelinus burchami Evermann & Goldsborough, 1907 (Dusky sculpin)
 Icelinus cavifrons C. H. Gilbert, 1890 (Pit-head sculpin)
 Icelinus filamentosus C. H. Gilbert, 1890 (Threadfin sculpin)
 Icelinus fimbriatus C. H. Gilbert, 1890 (Fringed sculpin)
 Icelinus japonicus Yabe, Tsumura & Katayama, 1980
 Icelinus limbaughi Rosenblatt & W. L. Smith, 2004 (Canyon sculpin)
 Icelinus oculatus C. H. Gilbert, 1890 (Frogmouth sculpin)
 Icelinus pietschi Yabe, Soma & Amaoka, 2001
 Icelinus quadriseriatus (Lockington, 1880) (Yellowchin sculpin)
 Icelinus tenuis C. H. Gilbert, 1890 (Spotfin sculpin)

Characteristics
Icelinus sculpins are characterised by having the fourth uppermost spine on the preoperculum having a number of points like the antler of a deer. They have a single spine and  2 soft rays in the pelvic fin and there are two rows of ctenoid scales along the dorsal fin bases.

Distribution
Icelinus sculpins are found in the northern and eastern Pacific Ocean. They are inshore fishes.

References

Cottinae
 
Marine fish genera
Taxa named by David Starr Jordan